The UNESCO (United Nations Educational, Scientific and Cultural Organization) has designated six World Heritage Sites in the Philippines. The UNESCO World Heritage Sites are places of importance to cultural or natural heritage as described in the UNESCO World Heritage Convention.

The Philippines, following its ratification of the convention on Thursday, September 19, 1985, made its historical and natural sites eligible for inclusion on the list. The Philippines had its first sites included in 1993, and since 2014, has six sites on the list spanning nine locations. Of those six sites, three are cultural and three natural. The first 5 sites inscribed in the UNESCO Heritage List was initiated by ICOMOS Philippines, a non-profit heritage organization, which partnered with the UNESCO National Commission of the Philippines and the Heritage Conservation Society.

The Philippines has a cultural inventory, called the Philippine Registry of Cultural Property or PRECUP, and a natural inventory called the National Integrated Protected Areas System or NIPAS. Both of which were established by various Philippine laws. The intangible cultural heritage list of the Philippines is under the PRECUP.

The Philippines won its first ever mandate to the powerful World Heritage Committee in 1991 under President Corazon Aquino. The Filipino delegation served until 1997. Its second mandate was won in 2013 under President Noynoy Aquino. The Filipino delegation served until 2017.

World Heritage Sites 

In the 1990s, Filipino architect Augusto Villalón represented the Philippines in the UNESCO Committee and drafted the nomination dossiers of 5 heritage inscriptions. All the five inscriptions, which were the first five UNESCO sites in the Philippines, were declared as UNESCO World Heritage Sites from 1993 to 1999. These sites include the Baroque Churches of the Philippines (Miag-ao in Iloilo; Paoay in Ilocos Norte; Santa Maria in Ilocos Sur, and San Agustin in Manila);  Tubbataha Reef National Park, Puerto Princesa Subterranean River National Park, Historic City of Vigan, and the Rice Terraces of the Philippine Cordilleras After Villalón retired, the country had a 14-year drought in UNESCO World Heritage designations, which would be broken only in 2014, when Mount Hamiguitan Range Wildlife Sanctuary was declared as a UNESCO World Heritage Site.

The table lists information about each World Heritage Site:
Name: as listed by the World Heritage Committee
Location: city or province of site
Region: one of the 17 regions of the Philippines
UNESCO data: the year the site was inscribed on the World Heritage List; the criteria it was listed under: criteria i through vi are cultural, while vii through x are natural; (the column sorts by year added to the list)
Period: time of construction
Description: brief description of the site
Ref: references

Tentative list

The following 19 sites are on the Tentative List for the Philippines, meaning that the government intends to consider them for nomination in the future:

UNESCO-related activities of the Philippines

Early activities (1977–2000)
In 1977, the Puerto Galera Biosphere Reserve was inscribed in the UNESCO World Network of Biosphere Reserves. During that time, countries who have yet to ratify the UNESCO Convention were allowed to nominate sites in the biosphere reserve network. However, UNESCO participation of the Philippines was extremely limited due to the brutal Marcos dictatorship.

The Philippines ratified the UNESCO Convention on September 19, 1985, effectively becoming a member of the organization on the same date. However, activities concerning UNESCO nominations were only made after the successful People Power Revolution of 1986, which restored democracy in the Southeast Asian nation. UNESCO activities and preparations came afterwards under the support of President Corazon Aquino and notably through staunch heritage conservationist and architect, Augusto Villalón, who UNESCO hails as "one of Asia’s most renowned experts in heritage conservation" and "the father of heritage conservation in the Philippines". In 1990, the Palawan Biosphere Reserve was inscribed in the UNESCO World Network of Biosphere Reserves. In 1991, the Philippines under President Corazon Aquino won a mandate to the World Heritage Committee, serving until 1997, the first time the Philippines had a role in the powerful UNESCO committee.

From 1993 to 1999, five UNESCO sites, spanning nine locations, were inscribed in the UNESCO World Heritage List through the initiative of the Philippine government and Villalón's Heritage Conservation Society. These sites included the Baroque Churches of the Philippines (1993), Tubbataha Reefs Natural Park (1993), Rice Terraces of the Philippine Cordilleras (1995), Historic City of Vigan (1999), and the Puerto-Princesa Subterranean River National Park (1999). In 1994, the Olango Island Wildlife Sanctuary was declared as a Ramsar wetland site under the Ramsar Convention of UNESCO. In 1995, the Philippines hosted UNESCO's "Regional Thematic Study Meeting on Asian Rice Culture and its Terraced Landscape" in the capital, Manila. In 1997, the Philippines participated in the "Asia-Pacific World Heritage Youth Forum" held in China and the "Asia-Pacific Heritage Site Managers' Workshop" held in Thailand. Villalón afterwards retired from the UNESCO Commission in 1999. The National Museum nominated the Philippine Paleographs (Hanunoo, Build, Tagbanua and Pala'wan) in 1999 to the UNESCO Memory of the World Register and was inscribed on the same year, becoming the first international documentary heritage coming from the Philippines. Additionally, three sites, namely, Naujan Lake National Park, Tubbataha Reefs Natural Park, and Agusan Marsh Wildlife Sanctuary, were declared as Ramsar wetland sites under the Ramsar Convention of UNESCO.

Pre-Heritage Act decade (2001–2010)

In 2001, the Heritage Conservation Society started its appeal to the officials of Batanes to establish conservation programs for a possible UNESCO inscription as the Batanes Protected landscapes and seascapes has been a UNESCO tentative site in 1993. On the same year, the Hudhud chant of the Ifugao was declared as one of the Eleven Masterpieces of the Oral and Intangible Heritage of Humanity. However, UNESCO also enlisted the Rice Terraces of the Philippine Cordilleras in the List of Sites in Danger, prompting local officials to initiate a province-wide conservation program for the terraces. Before the year ended, the Nelson Tower was named as an Honourable Mention in the UNESCO Asia Pacific Heritage Awards.

In 2003, Radio Veritas Asia, Raja Broadcasting Network, and Punzalan Personal Archives nominated the Radio Broadcast of the Philippine People Power Revolution in the UNESCO Memory of the World Register. The nomination was inscribed on the same year. Additionally, the Gota de Leche Building was named as an Honourable Mention in the UNESCO Asia Pacific Heritage Awards.

Additionally, the country nominated Batanes to the world heritage list, but it was deferred by UNESCO due to lack of conservation. The site officially was put in deferred status in 2005. In 2005, the Darangen epic chant of the Maranao was declared as a Masterpiece of the Oral and Intangible Heritage of Humanity. On the same year, the Far Eastern University was named as an Honourable Mention in the UNESCO Asia Pacific Heritage Awards.

In December 2005, the Philippines participated in the UNESCO Regional Workshop on Periodic Reporting Follow-up for North-East and South-East Asia, held in Malaysia. The country also participated in the Seeing with Young Eyes – Teacher Training Workshop of UNESCO in 2006, which was also conducted in Vigan in 2001. In August 2007, the "Living Landscapes and Cultural Landmarks: World Heritage Sites in the Philippines" was launched by Villalón. On the same year, the Batanes nomination was put in "referred status", pending for the dossier to be submitted by the local Ivatan authorities.

In 2007, the U.P. Center for Ethnomusicology nominated the José Maceda Collection to the UNESCO Memory of the World Register. The documentary heritage was inscribed on the same year. In 2008, the UNESCO Intangible Cultural Heritage Lists were established; both the Hudhud chant of the Ifugao and the Darangen epic chant of the Maranao were inscribed on the same year.

Middle of 2008, all the documents were ready except for the Batanes dossier. UNESCO set early 2010 as the deadline for the dossier for site inscription, however, the local officials of Batanes failed to make a dossier, and thus, the site was officially taken out from referred status. Due to this, the nomination reverted to zero. This failure led the Heritage Conservation Society to focus on the nomination of Davao Oriental's Mount Hamiguitan Range Wildlife Sanctuary, which became a UNESCO World Heritage Site in 2014. In September 2008, the Philippines participated in the "Workshop for the World Heritage property of Lumbini, the birthplace of Lord Buddha" held in Nepal. In 2009, the boundaries of Tubbataha Reefs Natural Park was expanded.

In April 2010, the Philippines participated in the "Sub-regional Workshop on the second cycle of Periodic Reporting in Asia and the Pacific" held in China. In late 2010, conservationists from the Heritage Conservation Society went to Batanes again to initiate a second nomination attempt. The organization found that non-traditional concrete structures were being established by locals in various sections of the islands, effectively diminishing the site's cultural value. The society appealed to the local government to stop the non-traditional buildings, but the local government retaliated against the conservationists. A report noted that traditional Ivatan houses were being converted into hollow block houses for the benefit of local politicians. In 2011, the government of Batanes formally nominated their province in UNESCO, but failed due to lack of cultural protections, lack of a holistic dossier, and the establishment of non-traditional buildings which have been approved by the provincial and municipal governments of Batanes at the time. Prompted by failures of past officials, the local governments of Batanes afterwards converged and declared a province-wide cultural and natural conservation program. The National Museum of the Philippines initiated the establishment of a branch museum in the province to preserve Ivatan heritage. The Heritage Conservation Society and National Commission for Culture and the Arts aided the conservation programs led by the Ivatan officials. The Philippine government has stated that once all conservation programs are deemed successful and fulfilled, the Philippines will again nominate Batanes to the UNESCO world heritage list.

Heritage Act enacted (2010–2016)

On April 10, 2010, the National Cultural Heritage Act (Republic Act No. 10066) formally came into effect. The law created the Philippine Registry of Cultural Property and took other steps to conserve, preserve, and restore Filipino cultural properties. In October 2011, two typhoons severely damaged the UNESCO-inscribed Rice Terraces in Ifugao, prompting a massive rehabilitation program. In 2011, the University of Michigan Library in partnership with the Philippine government nominated the Presidential Papers of Manuel L. Quezon. They were added to the UNESCO Memory of the World Register.

In mid-2011, the Philippines participated in the UNITAR Series on the Management and Conservation of World Heritage Sites with a theme of "Preparing World Heritage Nominations: Continuity and Change within UNESCO's New Manual". The country was represented by the Heritage Conservation Society, the Batanes government, and the National Museum of the Philippines. Three factors were cited for the lack of world heritage declarations in the Philippines, namely, (1) the lack of awareness about UNESCO World Heritage among local stakeholders, especially the indigenous communities, local governments and residents that live around these potential sites, (2) the absence of competent people who are fully aware of the processes involved in preparing and providing the correct documents for nomination as World Heritage, and (3) the lack of government funding to prepare and support these nominations, among many others. It was also noted that describing a nominated property as "unique" is the worst argument one could give for UNESCO nomination as all sites are not unique and there are always similar properties it can be compared with. The Outstanding Universal Value (OUV) based on at least one of the ten criteria should be clearly established as well, according to UNESCO. According to UNESCO, the most important part of the nomination is the comparative analysis of the site as extensive comparison with other similar properties is vital to prove OUV and push nomination forward. Due to this, the Filipino delegations acknowledged the need to rewrite the dossier for Batanes, as it had been rejected before due to lacking information for an actual nomination to be accepted by UNESCO. Due to these findings, the Philippine government would later establish three legs for the UNESCO Pamana (Heritage) Workshop from 2016 to 2017 for the tentative sites and possible tentative sites of the country.

By November 2011, the Batangas government proposed to establish a "Hollywood sign" on top of the Taal Volcano, which at the time was a UNESCO tentative site, receiving criticism. The government later retracted the proposal. In March 2012, the Swiss-based Jaeger-LeCoultre initiated an auction which benefited the conservation programs for the Puerto-Princesa Subterranean River National Park. In June 2012, the Rice Terraces of the Philippine Cordilleras was officially removed from the list of UNESCO World Heritage Sites in Danger, marking the country's most successful cultural landscape rehabilitation achievement. In the same month, the Puerto Princesa Subterranean River National Park was declared as a Ramsar wetland site under the Ramsar Convention of UNESCO. In September 2012, the Philippines participated in the "Joint International Symposium: Involving Communities for Better Conservation and Management of Asian World Heritage Sites" held in South Korea. In October 2012, the Tubbataha Reefs Natural Park won the Future Policy Award for marine resource management, the first Philippine site to receive the prestigious international conservation award. On the same month, the Heritage City of Vigan was recognized for "best practice in World Heritage Site management."

In 2013, the Philippines under President Noynoy Aquino won its second mandate to the powerful World Heritage Committee, serving until 2017. In January of the same year, an American vessel ran aground in the Tubbataha Reefs Natural Park. The United States government afterwards paid 87 million pesos in compensation. In March 2013, the Las Piñas-Parañaque Critical Habitat and Ecotourism Area was declared as a Ramsar wetland site under the Ramsar Convention of UNESCO. In June 2013, the Philippines participated in the "International World Heritage Youth Forum: Living with Heritage: Temple, Environment and People (T.E.P.)" held in Cambodia. In May 2013, a Chinese vessel crashed in the Tubbataha Reefs Natural Park, destroying approximately 3,902 square meters (42,000 square feet) of coral. Additionally, brutally-killed endangered pangolins from the Palawan Biosphere Reserve were inside the Chinese ship. Pangolins are protected under Philippine laws and the international treaty, CITES, where the Philippines is a signatory. In September 2013, the Philippines launched the "Pamana: World Heritage in the Philippines" funded by UNESCO. In October 2013, the 7.2-magnitude Central Visayas earthquake damaged and destroyed numerous cultural properties in the Philippines. Three weeks later, in November 2013, Typhoon Haiyan, the most powerful typhoon of the century, hit the country, destroying and damaging more heritage sites. On the same month, the Philippines was elected in the World Heritage Committee. In early 2014, the faithful restoration of the sites began, and would continue for approximately one decade.

In April 2014, the Philippines participated in the "UNESCO Asia Pacific World Heritage Project on Marine Biodiversity & Climate Change Awareness among Youth" held in New Caledonia. Afterwards, the National Commission for Culture and the Arts launched the Sagisag Kultura, a long-term cultural mapping program that lists and discusses the cultural icons of the Philippines, both intangible and tangible, living and non-living. In June 2014, the Mount Hamiguitan Range Wildlife Sanctuary was inscribed in the UNESCO World Heritage List, becoming the sixth world heritage site of the country since the country's last inscription in 1999.

On March 20, 2015, the UNESCO Tentative List of the Philippines was revised after recommendations from the UNESCO due to changes within the proposed sites, notably due to human causes and natural causes such as the 2013 central Philippines typhoon-earthquake. Among the sites that were removed from the tentative list were Taal Volcano Protected Landscape, Panglao Island, Mount Apo Natural Park, Maragondon Church, San Sebastian Church (Manila), Baclayon Church, Spanish Colonial Fortifications of the Philippines, Agusan Marsh Wildlife Sanctuary, Liguasan Marsh, Mount Matutum Protected Landscape, Mount Kitanglad, and Mount Kalatungan. In April 2015, a new management plan was launched for Tubbataha Reefs Natural Park which focuses on the site's "Outstanding Universal Value".

In May 2015, the Philippines applied for better protection for marine World Heritage Sites at the UNESCO-affiliated International Maritime Organisation. In August 2015, the Philippine Heritage Map was launched by Arches, Getty Conservation Institute, World Monuments Fund, National Commission for Culture and the Arts, National Museum of the Philippines, and the National Historical Commission of the Philippines. On the same month, the Philippines participated in the UNESCO-initiated World Heritage Volunteers 2015 Action Camps. In September 2015, the Philippines participated in the "10th International Training Programme on Disaster Risk Management of Cultural Heritage" held in Japan. In December 2015, the Punnuk – tugging ritual of the Ifugao was included in Tugging Rituals and Games of the UNESCO Intangible Cultural Heritage Lists.

In January 2016, the Philippines participated in the international dialogue on "Understanding rights practices in the World Heritage system: lessons from the Asia-Pacific and the global area" held in Switzerland. In March 2016 the Albay Biosphere Reserve was inscribed in the UNESCO World Network of Biosphere Reserves. On April 14–15, 2016, the first leg of the UNESCO Pamana (Heritage) Workshop of the Philippine government was administered in Puerto Princesa, Palawan. In the same month, the International Maritime Organization approved “in principle” the "Particularly Sensitive Sea Area Status" for Tubbataha Reefs Natural Park.

In June 2016, the Heritage Conservation Society and the United States embassy conducted a cultural-tourism program for the Agusan Marsh Wildlife Sanctuary, a step closer for the site's re-submission in the UNESCO tentative list. On September 15–16, 2016, the second part of the UNESCO Pamana (Heritage) Workshop was administered in Mati, Davao Oriental. In October 2016, the Negros Occidental Coastal Wetlands Conservation Area was declared as a Ramsar wetland site under the Ramsar Convention of UNESCO.

Present prospects (2017–present)

In January 2017, Nickelodeon announced an underwater resort within the UNESCO tentative site of Coron Natural Biotic Area, which is also part of the Palawan Biosphere Reserve, receiving criticism from various sectors and majority of Coron residents. The planned resort was later aborted in August 2017. On March 23–24, the third and final leg of the UNESCO Pamana (Heritage) Workshop was administered in Legaspi City, Albay on March 23–24, 2017. In May 2017, the Philippines participated in the "UNESCO Expert Meeting for the World Heritage Nomination Process of the Maritime Silk Routes" held in the United Kingdom. In July 2017, the Tubbataha Reefs Natural Park was declared by UNESCO to have been protected from international shipping impacts. On the same month, the Philippines participated in the "World Heritage Young Professionals Forum 2017 " held in Poland. In September 2017, the Philippines participated in the "Capacity Building Workshop on Nature-Culture Linkages in Heritage Conservation in Asia and the Pacific" held in Japan. In October 2017, the Philippines participated in the "Photo Exhibit: Coral Reefs on UNESCO's World Heritage List" held in France. In November 2017, Baguio was declared as a "Creative City for Crafts and Folk Arts" and was inscribed in the UNESCO Creative Cities Network, becoming the country's first inscription in the network.

In 2018, the NCCA initiated a 3D laser scan program for all UNESCO cultural world heritage sites in the country as preparation for disasters in the future. The project ended in March 2018. On 30 May, the Culion Leprosy Archives was inscribed the UNESCO Memory of the World Committee for Asia and the Pacific (Mowcap), a step closer to the international memory list. In July 2018, the Philippines participated in the "2018 Capacity Building Workshop on Nature-Culture Linkages in Heritage Conservation in Asia and the Pacific" held in Japan. On October 1, 2018, it was revealed that a planned highrise building of Summithome Realty Corporation near San Sebastian Church had negatively affected the site's possible re-inclusion in the UNESCO tentative list, sparking criticism. On November 19, 2018, UNESCO warned the Philippines on the possible delisting of the Baroque Churches of the Philippines from the world heritage site due to a planned China-funded bridge that would negatively impact the buffer zone of Manila's San Agustin Church. Despite receiving criticism, the government stated that the planned bridge will still commence. The bridge has staunchly been rejected by some officials of the NCCA.

In 2019, the CIPDH-UNESCO launched the #MemoriasSituadas project, which maps sites of memory linked to serious human rights violations. The Bantayog ng mga Desaparecido of the Philippines was inscribed in the project. The monument honors the victims of the brutal Marcos dictatorship. In May 2019, an NCCA report noted that the bridge construction has stopped. The Filipino heritage community has disputed the reports as construction in the field is still ongoing up to the present. In December 2019, the Buklog, thanksgiving ritual system of the Subanen, was added to the UNESCO Intangible Cultural Heritage Lists. In 2021, the Sasmuan Pampanga Coastal Wetlands was declared as a Ramsar Wetland Site.

See also

 Arts in the Philippines
 Culture of the Philippines
 Architecture of the Philippines
 Philippine Registry of Cultural Property
 List of protected areas of the Philippines
 List of Ramsar sites in the Philippines
 Biosphere reserves of the Philippines
 Archaeology of the Philippines
 Intangible Cultural Heritage of the Philippines
 Lists of Cultural Properties of the Philippines
 National Commission for Culture and the Arts
 Tourism in the Philippines
 List of national parks of the Philippines
 List of mosques in the Philippines

References

External links
 

 
Philippines
Historic sites in the Philippines
Philippines history-related lists
Philippines geography-related lists
Heritage registers in the Philippines
Landmarks in the Philippines
Lists of tourist attractions in the Philippines